Çambaşı is a village in the Bozkurt District of Denizli Province in Turkey.

References

Villages in Bozkurt District